The Irwin 23 is an American trailerable sailboat that was designed by Ted Irwin as a cruiser and first built in 1968.

Production
The design was built by Irwin Yachts in the United States, from 1968 until 1975, but it is now out of production.

Design
The Irwin 23 is a recreational keelboat, built predominantly of fiberglass, with wood trim. It has a masthead sloop rig, a spooned raked stem, a plumb transom, an internally mounted spade-type rudder controlled by a tiller and a fixed fin keel, with retractable centerboard. It displaces  and carries  of lead ballast.

The boat is normally fitted with a small  outboard motor for docking and maneuvering.

The design has sleeping accommodation for four people, with a double "V"-berth in the bow cabin, a drop-down dinette table and a straight settee in the main cabin and an aft pilot berth on the port side. The galley is located on the port side amidships. The galley is equipped with a sink. The head is located in the bow cabin on the starboard side.

For sailing downwind the design may be equipped with a symmetrical spinnaker.

Operational history
The boat is supported by an active class club, the Irwin Yacht Owners.

In a 2010 review Steve Henkel wrote, "The Irwin 23 was the smallest boat commercially produced by Irwin, who ended up building hundreds of boats and dozens of models. Best features: Among her comp[etitor]s, the Irwin is probably the fastest boat, despite her PHRF rating and maximum theoretical speed being equal to both the Sovereign [23 and Sovereign Antares], which have no centerboard for going upwind efficiently, as does the Irwin. The Sovereigns also have higher topsides and a taller cabin, which may provide better headroom but contribute 'top hamper' or windage that tends to slow the boat upwind. Worst features: Irwin's construction quality tended to be so-so at best."

See also
List of sailing boat types

References

Keelboats
1960s sailboat type designs
Sailing yachts
Trailer sailers
Sailboat type designs by Ted Irwin
Sailboat types built by Irwin Yachts